The 1937 Gruppa B was third season of the Soviet (second tier) professional football competitions.

Unlike the previous season that was split into two halves, this one was played as a double round-robin among seven teams. The tournament was won by Spartak Leningrad that according to pre-season regulation was to be promoted to the Gruppa A for 1938 season, however later arrangements for the next season were changed and all participants except for the last placed Dinamo Kazan gained promotion.

Also, after only playing 3 of its scheduled games and winning only one of them, CSKA Moscow was transferred to Gruppa A mid-season.

Teams
No teams were relegated to the Gruppa B.

Promoted
One team was promoted from the 1936 Gruppa V fall tournament.
 Dinamo Kazan – (debut)

League standings

Top scorers

See also
 Soviet First League

References

External links
 1937 Gruppa B. RSSSF
 1937 Gruppa B. Luhansk Our Football. (in Russian)

1937
2
Soviet
Soviet